Cape Filchner is an ice-covered cape fronting on Davis Sea, 17 miles west-northwest (WNW) of Adams Island. Cape Filchner is the division between Wilhelm II Coast and Queen Mary Coast. Cape Filchner was discovered by the Australian Antarctic Expedition (1911-1914) under Sir Douglas Mawson, who named it for Wilhelm Filchner, leader of the German Antarctic Expedition of 1911-1912.

Filchner